is a railway station in Miyazaki City, Miyazaki Prefecture, Japan. It is operated by JR Kyushu and is on the Nippō Main Line.

Lines

Layout 
The station, which is unstaffed, consists of a side platform serving a single track at grade. There is no station building. From the access road, a short flight of steps leads directly to the platform where there is a shelter housing Sugoca card readers.

Adjacent stations

History
Japanese National Railways opened Hasugaike as an additional temporary stop on the existing track of the Nippō Main Line on 1 December 1986. With the privatization of JNR on 1 April 1987, the station came under the control of JR Kyushu which upgraded Hasugaike to a full station.

Passenger statistics
In fiscal 2016, the station was used by an average of 196 passengers (boarding only) per day.

See also
List of railway stations in Japan

References

External links
Hasugaike (JR Kyushu)

Railway stations in Miyazaki Prefecture
Railway stations in Japan opened in 1986